Ricardo Antonio Rosselló Nevares (born March 7, 1979) is a Puerto Rican politician who served as the governor of Puerto Rico from 2017 to 2019. He resigned on August 2, 2019, after protests related to the Telegramgate scandal. He is the son of former governor of Puerto Rico and pediatric surgeon Pedro Rosselló.

In 2010, Rosselló founded the political advocacy group Boricua ¡Ahora Es! to advocate for changing the current political status of Puerto Rico. Rosselló supports Puerto Rican statehood. Following several years of political advocacy, Rosselló announced that he would seek the nomination of the New Progressive Party (PNP in Spanish) for Governor of Puerto Rico in 2016. After winning the New Progressive Party primary, Rosselló was elected governor in the 2016 general election, defeating five other candidates.

In July 2019, Rosselló faced widespread controversy after a group chat on the Telegram app between Rosselló and his staff was made public. The chat included vulgar, sexist, homophobic and misogynistic language, a discussion of the operation of Internet troll networks on social media, elitist comments, and mockery of the troubles of Puerto Ricans as they continue to recover from 2017's Hurricane Maria that caused approximately 3,000 deaths. In one message, Rosselló's chief financial officer joked about the people who died in Hurricane Maria, and an apparent death threat made by Rosselló against Mayor of San Juan Carmen Yulín Cruz. As a result of the leak, protests were held for several consecutive days throughout Puerto Rico demanding Rosselló's resignation. An estimated 500,000 people took to Old San Juan on July 17, 2019, as part of the protests. After first stating that he intended to complete his term as governor, Rosselló later promised to resign on August 2, which he did.

Early life and education
Rosselló was born 1979 in San Juan, Puerto Rico, the son of Pedro Rosselló and Maga Nevares. His older brothers are Juan Óscar (b. 1971) and Luis Roberto (b. 1973). Pedro Rosselló served as Governor of Puerto Rico from 1993 to 2001. Rosselló's paternal great-grandfather, Pedro Juan Rosselló Batle, immigrated in 1902 at the age of 23 from Lloseta, Mallorca, Spain.

Rosselló attended high school at Colegio Marista de Guaynabo. He was selected to compete in the International Mathematical Olympiads.

Rosselló earned a bachelor's degree from the Massachusetts Institute of Technology (MIT) in 2001 in biomedical engineering and economics. As a researcher in college, Rosselló focused on adult stem cell research. He received a Ph.D. in biomedical engineering from the University of Michigan

Early career

Scientific career
Rosselló is a co-founder of Beijing Prosperous Biopharm, a medical research company in Beijing, China.  Rosselló claimed to have developed various drugs then later clarified that they were still in the research phase of development.

Early political involvement
Rosselló became involved in politics during the 2008 Puerto Rico gubernatorial election when his father Pedro Rosselló lost a party primary against the eventual Governor Luis Fortuño. Rosselló was a Hillary Clinton delegate to the 2008 nominating convention and an Obama delegate to the 2012 convention. In 2008, he participated in Clinton's get-out-the-vote efforts for the June 1 Puerto Rico presidential primary, appearing in her final TV ad with several Democratic political leaders, including fellow statehooder Kenneth McClintock and commonwealth's Roberto Prats and José A. Hernández Mayoral.

Following this event, Rosselló became a political commentator, writing columns for El Vocero, a daily newspaper published in San Juan, covering politics, science, healthcare and economics topics. Additionally, Rosselló appeared as a regular guest analyst in several political radio talk shows.

He published a book that depicted the accomplishments of his father's administration (1993–2001). All copies of the limited edition print were exhausted in one day. To diffuse the message, he allowed the material to be public domain and published it on the La Obra de Rosselló website for everyone to read.

In 2012, Rosselló founded Boricua ¡Ahora Es!, a political advocacy group that advocates changing Puerto Rico's current political status. The movement featured a grass-roots educational campaign, suggesting that involvement of the international community may be necessary for the United States government to take action. Boricua ¡Ahora Es! actively campaigned during the 2012 Puerto Rico status referendum.

Rosselló was accused by Bolivian author Lupe Andrade of plagiarizing her column Responsabilidad y democracia ("Accountability and Democracy"). He denied the claim and no legal action followed.

Governor of Puerto Rico

2016 gubernatorial campaign

Since 2012, Rosselló was mentioned as a potential gubernatorial candidate for the 2016 election cycle.

In 2013, he began organizing a group of collaborators to build what he called Plan para Puerto Rico (Plan for Puerto Rico). This plan would serve as a blueprint to deal with the economic and political problems and Puerto Rico and by being built years before a candidacy, it would represent a more complete and realistic political agenda. In 2014, Rosselló utilized his political platform to perform several protest events against the policies of the incumbent governor of Puerto Rico, Alejandro García Padilla. Some of these events included a march against a proposed Value Added Tax. Rosselló described that he intended to apply a scientific approach to governance. As a part of this, he traveled to other countries and US states to study how they approached various problems in governing, such as Finland, Estonia, and Florida.

On September 19, 2015, he confirmed his intention to run for Governor of Puerto Rico in the 2016 election, and held a campaign rally the next day at Roberto Clemente Coliseum in San Juan that surpassed the previous attendance record held by Ricky Martin. At the rally, he endorsed Jenniffer González, a Republican, for Resident Commissioner.

On June 5, 2016, Rosselló won the New Progressive Party primary against incumbent Resident Commissioner Pedro Pierluisi, thus becoming the party's candidate for governor and heading to the general election against PPD candidate David Bernier. He made Puerto Rican statehood the central issue of his campaign, and views statehood as the key to economic recovery.

On November 8, 2016, Rosselló defeated five other gubernatorial candidates and was elected Governor of Puerto Rico, receiving 41% of the vote. He was sworn in on January 2, 2017.

Tenure

Domestic policies

Upon his election, Rosselló was the second-youngest person to become Governor of Puerto Rico. On his first day as governor, Rosselló signed six executive orders. His first executive order was the OE-2017-001, decreeing a state of fiscal emergency. The second order was the OE-2017-002, which creates the COF with the intent of obtaining, maximizing and overseeing more federal funds. The third executive order, OE-2017-003, looks to streamline the permit obtaining process for development of projects that promote a new or improved infrastructure for the lending of services for the citizens and for economic development within Puerto Rico. The fourth executive order, OE-2017-004, creates an interagency group of projects critical for the infrastructure, a collateral effect of the OE 2017–003. The fifth executive order, OE-2017-005, orders the implementation of the method of zero base budget for the preparation of the budget for the fiscal year 2017–2018. The last executive order Rosselló signed on his first day was the OE-2017-006; it decrees a public policy within the Government of Puerto Rico that guarantees equal pay and work for women employees. He also began the process of restructuring Puerto Rico's national debt.

In 2017, Rosselló signed the Permitting Reform Act, streamlining business permitting processes on the island, and he also created the Puerto Rico Department of Public Safety. In July 2017, Rosselló signed a bill that enacts regulations and makes the use of marijuana legal for medicinal use. The move goes further than the executive order issued by his predecessor which in Roselló's words, "ignored the legislative process and, following an executive order, promulgated a regulation without due discussion with all sectors and representatives elected by the people." Rosselló has stated that he intends to shrink the size of government, through reducing funding to various parts of the bureaucracy. He also started an effort on labor reform, which was revoked after differences between the governor's intended version and the version developed by the Financial Oversight and Management Board. Rosselló then tabled a second version of the plan in March 2018.

Rosselló took credit for raising the minimum wage in Puerto Rico. and in 2017 signed the Equal Pay Act, pushing for equal pay regardless of gender. In 2018 he signed six laws targeting the reform of the insurance industry, as a response to how insurance companies acted during recent hurricanes. In December 2017, Rosselló signed the "New Government Law", which was intended to consolidate agencies in order to improve efficiency and save capital. Rosselló stated, "the objective is to establish a platform where we can reduce a 131 agencies to 30 or 35 agencies in Puerto Rico."

In June 2019, Ricardo Rosello announced that $2 million had been appropriated to the Puerto Rico Office for Socioeconomic and Community Development (ODSEC by its Spanish initials) for construction of new roofs. The total number of homes that could receive new roofs was 180, of the 20,000 to 30,000 homes still missing roofs since Hurricane Maria hit Puerto Rico on September 20, 2017.  Wanda Vázquez Garced, the governor who followed his troubled tenure, stated all contracts signed by Rosselló would be reviewed by her administration. Rosselló's alleged corruption was given as a reason to further delay promised funds for Hurricane Maria recovery, as announced by United States Department of Housing and Urban Development on August 6, 2019.

Economic strategies

By the time Rosselló took office, the Puerto Rican government-debt crisis posed serious problems for the government which was saddled with outstanding debt of $70billion or $12,000 per capita at a time with a 45% poverty rate and 14.2% unemployment that is more than twice the mainland U.S. average.

The Commonwealth had been defaulting on many debts, including bonds, since 2015. Rosselló discussed the situation and sketched out his plans in an interview with the international Financial Times in mid January and indicated that he would seek an amicable resolution with creditors and also make fiscal reforms. "There will be real fiscal oversight and we are willing to sit down. We are taking steps to make bold reforms. ... What we are asking for is runway to establish these reforms and have Washington recognise that they have a role to play." He also implemented austerity measures, instructing Puerto Rican government agencies to cut operating expenses by 10% and reduce political appointees by 20%.

To ensure funds would be available to pay for "essential" government services Rosselló signed a fiscal emergency law on January 28, 2017, that would set aside funds that might otherwise be required for debt payments.

In late January, the federal control board created under PROMESA gave the government until February 28 to present a fiscal plan - including negotiations with creditors - to solve the problems. It is essential for Puerto Rico to reach restructuring deals to avoid a bankruptcy-like process under PROMESA. A moratorium on lawsuits by debtors was extended to May 31.

Rosselló hired investment experts Rothschild & Co to assist in convincing creditors to take deeper losses on Puerto Rico's debts than they had expected. The company was also exploring the possibility of convincing insurers that had guaranteed some of the bonds against default, to contribute more to the restructuring, according to reliable sources. The governor also planned to negotiate restructuring of about $9billion of electric utility debt, a plan that could result "in a showdown with insurers". Political observers suggest that his negotiation of the electrical utility debt indicated Rosselló's intention to take a harder line with creditors. Puerto Rico has received authority from the federal government to reduce its debt with legal action and this may make creditors more willing to negotiate instead of becoming embroiled in a long and costly legal battle.

On May 31, Rosselló unveiled his $9.56billion proposed budget for the 2018 fiscal year. The budget prioritized paying pensions, increasing spending in the island's health system, public safety, and transportation. At the same time, the budget proposed cutting in the departments of education, natural resources, housing, agriculture, correction, and justice. Of the education cuts, it included over a $200million cut for Puerto Rico's public university, which had experienced organized student strikes for over two months. The budget directed $2billion for the public pension system of Puerto Rico that were underfunded by about $50billion. To balance this increase, the budget eliminated millions of dollars in annual subsidies to 78 municipalities of Puerto Rico, forcing the mayors to find funding in other areas. In addition, the budget focused payments for the debt services and the federal control board. Rosselló also announced tax breaks for the working class and retirees.

A tax reform bill was presented by the governor in December 2018, which included a work tax credit of between $300 and $2000 to each taxpayer and reduced the corporate tax rate from 39% to 37.5%. Prior to this, Rosselló reduced the sales tax from 11.5% to 7% for restaurant prepared foods.

During 2018, Rosselló announced that Puerto Rico had reached its lowest unemployment rate in the region history, at 9.3%.  However, because Rosselló had fired the director of Puerto Rico's Office of Statistics due to dissatisfaction with the unflattering reports emanating from that office, it is unclear how accurate this information (or any of the statistical data touted by the Rosselló administration) is. In June 2018, he began the process of privatizing the island's energy infrastructure, and in November 2018, he pledged for Puerto Rico to switch entirely to renewable energy by 2050. In 2018 Rosselló also started InvestPR, a program intended to attract business investment to Puerto Rico, put in place by Law 13–2017; in addition to creating the Destination Marketing Organization, which encourages tourists to visit the island, enacted in 2017 by Law 17–2017.

Education
On February 5, 2018, Rosselló announced a broad education reform. The reform aim to incorporate school vouchers and charter schools into the bankrupt U.S. territory's education system. It was signed into law in March 2018.

Inter-state positions
In 2019, Rosselló became the president of the Council of State Governments.

Social issues
Rosselló is considered socially liberal. He supports abortion rights, gender equality, legalization of medical marijuana but opposes its legalization for recreational use. In terms of LGBT rights, Rosselló has a mixed record. Initially, he came out against marriage equality, however he was a proponent of adoption rights for same-sex couples, created the first advisory board on LGBT issues, supported a ban on conversion therapy and under his administration for the first time the residence of the governor was illuminated in rainbow colors, a nod to the support of his administration to the LGBT community. Furthermore, Rosselló was highly critical of President Donald Trump's anti-immigration policies.

Views on statehood
Rosselló was strongly in favor of statehood for Puerto Rico to help develop the economy and to help Puerto Rico's 500-year old colonial dilemma. "Colonialism is not an option .... It's a civil rights issue ... The time will come in which the United States has to respond to the demands of 3.5million citizens seeking an absolute democracy" he stated. In January 2017, he announced that Puerto Ricans will be given an opportunity to vote in the fifth plebiscite on June 11, 2017, with three options: "Statehood", "Current Territorial Status" and "Independence/Free Association". It initially did not offer the second option, which was added at the request of United States Department of Justice (U.S. DOJ).

On June 11, 2017, the results of the plebiscite were 97% in favor of statehood. However, the plebiscite results have been marred and been called into question. Due to months of calls for boycotting by his political rivals and confusion, the turnout for the plebiscite was 23% of the eligible electorate. Rosselló plans on creating a commission that will ensure the validity of the referendum in Congress. He has stated that he does not believe that Puerto Rico yet has the political infrastructure to pursue statehood, and that he intends to develop it.

Telegram scandal

On July 8, 2019, screenshots of a group chat on the Telegram messaging service, which the governor belonged to, were leaked. The authenticity of these screenshots was confirmed the following day by Chief of Staff Ricardo Llerandi, who — along with several other high-ranking government officials — participated in the chat. Some on Twitter have dubbed the scandal Telegramgate.

Rosselló interrupted his vacation in France to fly to Puerto Rico and attend a press conference where he took responsibility for his part in the Telegram chat. Rosselló released a statement in which he apologized for the comments, excusing himself by explaining that he had been working 18-hour days and was releasing tension. Rosselló added that he would not resign as Governor of Puerto Rico and indicated that he did not know who leaked the chat or when it was deleted. On July 13, 2019, the entirety of the chat was made public by local news agency Centro de Periodismo Investigativo.

The screenshots were reported by El Nuevo Día as containing vulgar and homophobic comments and attacks against other politicians, such as former Speaker of the New York City Council Melissa Mark-Viverito, as well as local journalists and celebrities. Several members of the New Progressive Party also condemned the governor's expressions. The transcript, released July 13, shows government officials, including Rosselló, conspiring to operate an internet troll network to discredit press, journalists and opposition politicians, according to several news sources. In one message, Rosselló jokes about shooting Carmen Yulín Cruz, the mayor of San Juan. Allegedly, Rosselló improperly conducted public business on the chat, as one of the participants — Elías Sánchez — no longer worked directly with Rosselló. The chat has been cited as giving Sánchez an unfair advantage in his business dealings, as he was privy to internal government affairs while working for Wolf Popper, a company that does business with government agencies.

Puerto Rico's sole representative in the U.S. Congress, Jenniffer González, said that she believed Rosselló should not seek re-election as a result of the incident, but supported the idea that he should remain in office. Thomas Rivera Schatz, President of the Puerto Rican Senate, called upon Rosselló and every government official included in the chat to resign, but not before supporting the Governor's position to remain in office, and downplaying the protests calling for Rosselló's resignation as a "small" group of people that are "always protesting". Calls for his resignation were made by Democratic U.S. Representative Raúl Grijalva, chair of the House Natural Resources Committee; former governor Sila María Calderón, former governor Luis Fortuño, former Secretary of the U.S. Department of Housing and Urban Development, and presidential contender Julian Castro, and Democratic U.S. Representative and presidential contender Tulsi Gabbard.

On July 17, 2019, an estimated 500,000 people participated in a mass protest in Old San Juan calling for Rosselló to resign as governor. Artists such Ricky Martin  were present. Protests were also held in other cities and countries, including London, Santiago, Montreal, Seattle, New York City, Boston, Orlando, Amsterdam, Barcelona, Madrid, Stockholm, Paris, Slovenia, Norway, and Vienna.

On July 24, 2019, after previously defending the Governor and refusing to impeach him, the Puerto Rico Legislative Assembly announced that they would immediately begin impeachment proceedings unless Rosselló resigned. Later that day he announced that he would resign as governor of Puerto Rico effective 5 pm AST August 2, to be replaced by Justice Secretary Wanda Vázquez Garced until she reportedly declined the position.

In his last minutes in office, Rosselló nominated Pedro Pierluisi as Secretary of State of Puerto Rico, with the intention of Pierluisi becoming Puerto Rico's next governor.

Personal life
Rosselló was married to Natasha Marie Cervi from 2008 to 2010.

On October 14, 2012, Rosselló married Beatriz Areizaga in a wedding ceremony held in New Orleans, Louisiana. The couple have a daughter, Claudia Beatriz, and a son, Pedro Javier.

His cousin is Roy Rossello, a singer and former member of boy band Menudo.

Rosselló was linked to a car accident caused by a drunk driver in 1994, when he was 15, that killed a woman and her child. The original 1994 newspaper note that reported on the crash, along with the victims' son and twin brother, respectively, named Rosselló as the drunk driver. The court that saw the case, however, concluded that the other person in the vehicle, Rosselló's friend Ricardo Molinari Such, was the driver.

Ancestry

References

Further reading

Research

Books

External links
 
 Ricardo Rossello on the Internet Movie Database

|-

|-

|-

1979 births
21st-century Puerto Rican politicians
American people of Asturian descent
Democratic Party (Puerto Rico) politicians
Democratic Party governors of Puerto Rico
Duke University fellows
Governors of Puerto Rico
Leaders ousted by a coup
Living people
MIT School of Engineering alumni
MIT School of Humanities, Arts, and Social Sciences alumni
New Progressive Party (Puerto Rico) politicians
Presidents of the New Progressive Party (Puerto Rico)
Puerto Rican people of Asturian descent
Puerto Rican people of Spanish descent
Puerto Rican Roman Catholics
University of Michigan College of Engineering alumni
Rosselló family